New Vernon may refer to:

 New Vernon, New Jersey
 New Vernon, New York
 New Vernon Township, Pennsylvania